Jack Haig can refer to:

 Jack Haig (actor) (1913-1989), English actor
 Jack Haig (cyclist) (born 1993), Australian cyclist